Blue Blooms the Gentian (German: Blau blüht der Enzian) is a 1973 West German musical comedy film directed by Franz Antel and starring Ilja Richter, Catharina Conti and Hansi Kraus.

The film's sets were designed by the art director Robert Fabiankovich. Location shooting took place in the winter sports resort of Kitzbühel.

Cast

References

External links

1970s musical comedy films
German musical comedy films
West German films
Films directed by Franz Antel
Films scored by Gerhard Heinz
Films set in Austria
Films set in hotels
Films set in the Alps
Skiing films
Constantin Film films
1973 comedy films
1970s German-language films
1970s German films